Jacques Vilfrid (born 23 January 1923, in Paris, died 21 January 1988, aged 65, in Paris) was a French film director, film writer, and film producer.

Filmography 
 More Whiskey for Callaghan (1955)
Le Triporteur (scenario, 1957)
Les Livreurs (scenario and dialogue, 1959)
Les Bricoleurs (scenario and dialogue, 1960)
Les Pique-assiette (scenario and dialogue, 1960)
Les Moutons de Panurge (dialogue, 1960)
Les Nouveaux Aristocrates (scenario and dialogue, 1961)
 We Will Go to Deauville (scenario, adaptation and dialogue, 1962)
Les Veinards (adaptation and dialogue, 1962) seulement les sketcks suivants
Le vison
Le repas gastronomique
Le yacht
Pouic-Pouic (scenario and adaptation, 1963)
Le Gendarme de Saint-Tropez (dialogue, 1964)
Faites sauter la banque (scenario, 1964)
Le Gendarme à New York (adaptation et dialogue, 1965)
 The Gorillas (scenario and dialogue, 1965)
Monsieur le président-directeur général (scenario and dialogue, 1966)
Les Grandes Vacances (scenario, adaptation and dialogue, 1967)
Un drôle de colonel (scenario and dialogue, 1968)
Le gendarme se marie (dialogue, 1968)
The Blonde from Peking (adaptation, 1968)
Hibernatus (dialogue, 1969)
Le Juge (dialogue, 1969)
Le Gendarme en balade (scénario, 1970)
Jo (scenario, 1971)
Le Concierge (scenario and dialogue, 1973)
Sam et Sally (scenario and dialogue, 1978)
Le gendarme et les extra-terrestres (dialogue, 1979)
Le gendarme et les gendarmettes (scenario, adaptation et dialogue, 1982)

External links 
 

French film directors
1923 births
1988 deaths